West Bradford may refer to:

West Bradford Township, Chester County, Pennsylvania
West Bradford, Lancashire
Bradford West (UK Parliament constituency)